An antenna tuning hut or helix house is a small shed at the base of a longwave or mediumwave radio transmitting antenna. It contains antenna tuner – radio equipment for coupling the power from the feedline to the antenna. Alternative names include antenna tuning house, coupling hut, and dog house.

Equipment

The radio frequency current from the transmitter is supplied to the antenna through a cable called the feedline. The antenna tuning hut contains a matching network made of high wattage capacitors and inductors (coils) that in combination match the antenna's impedance to the feedline, to efficiently transfer power into the antenna. The inductors, made of large helixes of wire, give the name helix house.

The powerful radio waves near the antenna can be a hazard for workers, so the interior of the antenna tuning hut is typically shielded with copper or aluminum sheeting or wire mesh, in order to reduce radiation from the tower. In operation the components can have a voltage of several hundred thousand volts.

The building may also contain lightning protection devices and power transformers for aircraft warning lights on the tower. The radio transmitter which generates the radio frequency current which powers the antenna is generally located away from the antenna, to prevent the powerful radio waves from interfering with the sensitive transmitter circuits.

See also
 Antenna tuning unit
 Radio frequency power transmission

References

Radio technology